Aphrosylus temaranus is a species of fly in the family Dolichopodidae.

Distribution
Morocco.

References

Hydrophorinae
Insects described in 1955
Diptera of Africa